Gérard Jugnot (born 4 May 1951) is a French actor, film director, screenwriter and film producer.

Jugnot was one of the founders of the comedy troupe Le Splendid in the 1970s, along with, among others, his high-school friends Christian Clavier, Thierry Lhermitte, and Michel Blanc. Then Josiane Balasko and Marie-Anne Chazel joined them. The group adapted a number of its stage hits for the cinema and was extremely successful in films such as Les Bronzés (1978), Les Bronzés font du ski (1979) and Le Père Noël est une ordure (1982).

Jugnot gained international fame for his lead role in Les Choristes in which he played Clément Mathieu. The last movie he directed was C'est beau la vie quand on y pense (2017).

Jugnot is the father of comedian Arthur Jugnot, born in 1980 to Jugnot and wardrobe designer Cécile Magnan.

He was made Chevalier (Knight) of the Légion d'honneur in 2004.

Life and career
Jugnot met Christian Clavier, Thierry Lhermitte, and Michel Blanc when attending the Lycee Pasteur de Neuilly-Sur-Seine. Together, they formed the comedy group Le Splendid. He made his debut on the big-screen in Les Valseuses (1974) and Le Juge et l'Assassin (1976).

Jugnot's career kick-started when he  starred in Les Bronzés (1978), and Le Père Noël est une ordure (1982), which were two acts from Le Splendid adapted for cinema.

Aside from acting, Jugnot also started a career as a movie director, making his directing debut in 1984 with the movie Pinot simple flic.

He also regularly took part in the radio show Les Grosses Têtes during the 1980s with Léon Zitrone, Olivier de Kersauson, Jacques Martin, and Jean Dutourd.

In 2010, he participated in Rendez-vous en terre inconnue.

Filmography

Actor

Director

Box office

Movies starring Gérard Jugnot with more than a million entries in France.

Notes

External links

1951 births
Living people
Male actors from Paris
Chevaliers of the Légion d'honneur
French male film actors
French film directors
French film producers
French male screenwriters
French screenwriters
French male stage actors
Lycée Pasteur (Neuilly-sur-Seine) alumni
Officers of the Ordre national du Mérite
20th-century French male actors
21st-century French male actors